is a Japanese gymnast and Olympic champion. He was part of the first Japanese team that succeeded to win gold medals in the team event at the Summer Olympics (1960) and World Championships (1962). In 2008 he was inducted to the International Gymnastics Hall of Fame.

Olympics
Tsurumi competed at the 1960 Summer Olympics in Rome where he received a gold medal in team combined exercises, and a bronze medal in pommel horse. At the 1964 Summer Olympics in Tokyo he received a gold medal in team combined exercises, and silver medals in individual all-around, pommel horse, and parallel bars.

World Championships
Tsurumi received a silver medal in individual all-around at the 1966 World Artistic Gymnastics Championships, and Japan won the team competition.

References

1938 births
Living people
Japanese male artistic gymnasts
Gymnasts at the 1960 Summer Olympics
Gymnasts at the 1964 Summer Olympics
Olympic gymnasts of Japan
Olympic gold medalists for Japan
Olympic medalists in gymnastics
Nippon Sport Science University alumni

Medalists at the 1964 Summer Olympics
Medalists at the 1960 Summer Olympics
Olympic silver medalists for Japan
Olympic bronze medalists for Japan
Gymnasts from Tokyo
20th-century Japanese people
21st-century Japanese people